DMBA may refer to:

 2,4-Dimethoxybenzaldehyde, a reagent used to specifically quantify phlorotannins
 para-Dimethylaminobenzaldehyde, a reagent used in Ehrlich's reagent and Kovac's reagent
 7,12-Dimethylbenz(a)anthracene, an immunosuppressant and powerful laboratory carcinogen
 1,3-Dimethylbutylamine, a designer stimulant sometimes found in dietary supplements